The 2005 European Figure Skating Championships was a senior international figure skating competition in the 2004–05 season. Medals were awarded in the disciplines of men's singles, ladies' singles, pair skating, and ice dancing. The event was held at the Palavela in Turin, Italy from 25 January through 30, 2005.

The Turin event was the official site-testing competition, or test event, for the 2006 Winter Olympics, which would be held in the same arena. It was the first European Championship to use the IJS which replaced the 6.0 system.

The compulsory dance was the Golden Waltz.

Qualifying
The competition was open to skaters from European ISU member nations who had reached the age of 15 before 1 July 2004. The corresponding competition for non-European skaters was the 2005 Four Continents Championships. National associations selected their entries based on their own criteria. Based on the results of the 2004 European Championships, each country was allowed between one and three entries per discipline.

Medals table

Competition notes
Evgeni Plushenko won his fourth European title, Irina Slutskaya her sixth, Tatiana Totmianina / Maxim Marinin their fourth, and Tatiana Navka / Roman Kostomarov their second. Susanna Pöykiö (silver) became the first Finn to medal in ladies' singles at the European Championships.

Results

Men

Ladies

Pairs
Totmianina / Marinin defended their European title three months after the 2004 Skate America accident.

Ice dancing

References

External links
 

European Figure Skating Championships, 2005
European Figure Skating Championships, 2005
European Figure Skating Championships
International figure skating competitions hosted by Italy
Sports competitions in Turin
2000s in Turin
January 2005 sports events in Europe